Demondrille Shire was a local government area in the South West Slopes region of New South Wales, Australia.

The Shire was established on 7 March 1906 and its offices were based in the town of Murrumburrahbut the Harden-Murrumburrah urban area was not in Demondrille Shire. The area covered by the shire was unincorporated prior to its creation. In 1975 Demondrille Shire was merged with the Municipality of Murrumburrah to form Harden Shire.

References

Former local government areas of New South Wales
1906 establishments in Australia
1975 disestablishments in Australia